Darr is a 1993 Bollywood film.

Darr may also refer to: 

 Aḍ-Ḍārr, one of the names of God in Islam, meaning "Distressor".
 Darr (surname)
 Darr, Nebraska, an unincorporated community in the United States
 darr, abbreviation for down arrow
 Darr Mine Disaster, a 1907 mine disaster in the United States
 Darr @ the Mall, a 2014 Indian horror film

See also
 Dar (disambiguation)

Names of God in Islam